Abdul Razzak Mirjan is the founder of the Mirjan Hospital, in Hilla province. He is also one of the original initial founders of the original Kufeh University alongside Syed Mahdi Muhsin Al-Hakim and Mohammed Makiya and Dr Kadhim Shubber. He is the father of Abdul-Wahab Mirjan, the Prime Minister of Iraq in 1957. He built and donated a number of mosques and also shrines for scholars in the mid Euphrates region of Iraq.

Early life 

Al Haj Abdul Razzak Mirjan was born in the town of Hilla in Iraq to a farming family. His father moved the family to the town of Nasiriyah in 1880, when the Euphrates River rerouted due to excessive sedimentations until, 1905 when the situation was improving with the start of the building of the Al Hindya Dam. The family returned to Hilla to develop further their farming activities where they cultivated farming land. Abdul Razzak was one of the pioneers in expanding rice farming to the region. This resulted in the land yielding a rice harvest in the summer and a wheat harvest in the winter amongst other yields such as cotton.

Career 

He built and donated mosques and a number of shrines for scientists and scholars in the mid Ephrates region of Iraq. These included the shrines for Jaafar Yahya Bin Saeed, Ibin Nema, Abu Al Fada yel – Ahmed Bin Tawoos Al Hilli amongst many others. He reconstructed the Al-Noukta Mosque, west of Aleppo in Syria. His name was synonymous with helping families in need and charitable donations.
When you enter the town of Hilla you will notice the grand entrance of "The Mirjan Hospital". Abdul Razzak Mirjan built the hospital with a contribution from his cousin Al Haj Abdul-Abbas Mirjan. The hospital, which stands in a 250,000 m2 plot along the Euphrates River, was bequeathed to the nation. It was by His Majesty King Faisal II on 22 March 1957 in a grand ceremony attended by over 5000 guests including Prime Minister Nuri al-Said and Crown Prince 'Abd al-Ilah of Hejaz. Originally a chest diseases hospital, The Mirjan Hospital continued to develop to become one of the main teaching hospital complexes for all specialties in the region.

Family 

His eldest son, Abdul Wahab Mirjan, had a career in politics he served as Prime Minister of Iraq in 1957 having previously been appointed in various cabinets as, Minister of Communication and Public Works, Minister of Economy, Ministry of Agriculture, Minister of Finance and was elected Speaker of the Chamber of Deputies, no less than eleven times. Abdul-Razzak Mirjan's second son is Abdul-Jalil, a lawyer, has continued to dedicated most of his time to following on, developing and the management of the family's farming business having had set up of a range of manufacturing industries in Baghdad. Abdul Razzak Jawad Ahmed Mahmoud Mansour Mirjan, from The Rabe’a Tribe, was a founding member of "Al Ikha’ Al Watanny" Party in 1931.

References

1883 births
1970 deaths
Iraqi farmers
Iraqi philanthropists
20th-century philanthropists